American Warships is a 2012 science fiction action film directed by Thunder Levin and distributed by The Asylum. It premiered on the Syfy Channel on May 15, 2012. In the tradition of The Asylum's film catalog, the film is an extremely low-budget mockbuster of the Hasbro Studios/Universal Pictures film Battleship.

Originally the film was titled American Battleship, but Universal later involved The Asylum in a copyright lawsuit over the film due to its resemblance to their film. As a result of the controversy, the name of the film was changed to American Warships.

Plot
 is on its final voyage before being decommissioned and turning into a floating museum. When  is attacked and destroyed by a mysterious force, World War III looms. The captain of Iowa chases an invisible ship, which they discover to be an alien force waging war on Earth. Only the crew of this last American battleship stands in their way. (The Iowa's outdated technology is immune to the electromagnetic pulse (EMP) weapons of the alien.)

During the fight, in Washington, D.C., General McKraken attempts to steer the high stake game of brinkmanship between the U.S. and other world powers as several coast towns in North Korea were also attacked, in an apparent attempt by the aliens to get the world to destroy itself. McKraken's diplomatic efforts attempt to buy Iowa time to provide proof of the alien incursion.

Cast
 Mario Van Peebles as Captain Winston
 Carl Weathers as General McKraken
 Elijah Chester as Secretary of Defense Alter
 Johanna Watts as Lt. Caroline Bradley
 Nikki McCauley as Julia Flynn
 Devin McGhee as Lt. Cmdr. Juarez
 Mandela Van Peebles as Lookout Dunbar
 Josh Cohen as Weapons Officer Clancy
 David Polinsky as Admiral Hollis
 Sean Smith as Ensign Von Buttmuncher
 William Sudbrock as Helmsman
 Robin Dale Robertson as Major

Reception
The Geek Twins rated the film 2 1/2 out of five stars.

References

External links
 American Warships at The Asylum
 

2012 independent films
2012 science fiction action films
2010s war films
2012 films
Alien invasions in films
American science fiction action films
Direct-to-video science fiction films
Films shot in Los Angeles
Mockbuster films
Syfy original films
The Asylum films
War adventure films
Films set on ships
2010s English-language films
Films shot in North Carolina
2010s American films